Spring Break 3…It's a Shore Thing is the fourth extended play (EP) by American country music artist Luke Bryan. It was released on March 1, 2011 by Capitol Nashville.

Track listing
Sources: AllMusic

Chart performance

Weekly charts

References

2011 EPs
Luke Bryan EPs
Capitol Records EPs